The men's 10,000 metres speed skating competition of the 2014 Sochi Olympics was held at Adler Arena Skating Center on 18 February 2014.

Qualification
A total of sixteen speed skaters could qualify for this distance, with a maximum of three skaters per country. The top 10 of the 2013–14 ISU Speed Skating World Cup – Men's 5000 and 10000 metres standings after the fourth World Cup race in Berlin secured a spot for their country. Then the additional six spots were awarded based on a time ranking of the World Cup 10,000 metres race in Astana. A reserve list was also made.

By virtue of Shane Dobbin's top eight classification at the 2013 World Single Distance Speed Skating Championships – Men's 10000 metres in the pre-olympic season, New Zealand was given a wildcard at the expense of number 16 Jordan Belchos of Canada.

Records
Prior to this competition, the existing world and Olympic records were as follows.

At the 2013 World Single Distance Speed Skating Championships the track record was set by Jorrit Bergsma at 12:57.69.

The following records were set during this competition.

OR = Olympic record, TR = track record

Results
During the Olympics, the Norwegian speed skaters Håvard Bøkko and Sverre Lunde Pedersen, who were all on the original start list, decided not to start the 10,000 meters to focus on the team pursuit that would be held a few days later. Norwegian speed skater Simen Spieler Nilsen, on the reserve list for the 10,000 meter, did not start for the same reason.
Russian speed skater Ivan Skobrev and French Alexis Contin also did not start. The open places were taken by Moritz Geisreiter, Patrick Meek and Sebastian Druszkiewicz.

The races were started at 17:00.

OR = Olympic record, TR = track record

References

External links
 2014 Winter Olympics results: Men's 10000 m, from http://www.sochi2014.com/en/;

Men's speed skating at the 2014 Winter Olympics